Germany national football team results may refer to:
 East Germany national football team results (1952–1990)
 Germany national football team results (1908–1929)
 Germany national football team results (1930–1942)
 Germany national football team results (1990–1999)
 Germany national football team results (2000–2019)
 Germany national football team results (2020–present)
 West Germany national football team results (1950–1990)